Eremberga insignis is a species of snout moth in the genus Eremberga. It was described by Carl Heinrich in 1939 and is found in Texas and Mexico.

The wingspan is about 35 mm. The forewings are very faintly dusted with white on the costal half. The lower half of the wing is faintly shaded with dull luteous (muddy yellowish) ocherous.

References

Moths described in 1939
Phycitini